A dominant minority, also called elite dominance,  is a minority group that has overwhelming political, economic, or cultural dominance in a country, despite representing a small fraction of the overall population (a demographic minority). Dominant minorities are also known as alien elites if they are recent immigrants.
 
The term is most commonly used to refer to an ethnic group which is defined along racial, national, religious, cultural or tribal lines and that holds a disproportionate amount of power.

A notable example is that of South Africa during the apartheid regime, where White South Africans, more specifically Afrikaners, wielded predominant control of the country, despite never composing more than 22 per cent of the population. African American-descended nationals in Liberia, White Zimbabweans in Rhodesia, Sunni Arabs in Ba'athist Iraq, the Alawite minority in Syria (since 1970 under the rule of the Alawite Assad family), and the Tutsi in Rwanda since the 1990s have also been cited as current or recent examples.
 
In Brazil, despite the majority of its population being racial African-Brazilians or pardos, those groups nevertheless live impoverished, have a high illiteracy rate, are more likely to be murdered, and are most likely to live in favelas (a Brazilian Portuguese slang for a slum). In contrast, the white population in the country has access to better education, job opportunities, and a higher wage. White Brazilians are better represented than other races in Brazil, including black people.

See also

Colonialism, particularly exploitation colonialism and plantation colonies
Elitism
Middleman minority
Minoritarianism
Minority influence
Model minority
Neocolonialism
Pseudo-secularism
Tyranny of the majority
World on Fire, a book that introduces the concept of "market-dominant minority"

Footnotes

References
Barzilai, Gad. Communities and Law: Politics and Cultures of Legal Identities (Ann Arbor: University of Michigan Press, 2003). 
Gibson, Richard. African Liberation Movements: Contemporary Struggles against White Minority Rule (Institute of Race Relations: Oxford University Press, London, 1972). 
Russell, Margo and Martin. Afrikaners of the Kalahari: White Minority in a Black State ( Cambridge University Press, Cambridge, 1979). 
Johnson, Howard and Watson, Karl (eds.). The White Minority in the Caribbean (Wiener Publishing, Princeton, NJ, 1998). , 
Chua, Amy. World on Fire: How Exporting Free Market Democracy Breeds Ethnic Hatred and Global Instability (Doubleday, New York, 2003). 
Haviland, William. Cultural Anthropology. (Vermont: Harcourt Brace Jovanovich College Publishers, 1993). p. 250-252. .
 

 
Ethnic groups
Ethnicity in politics
Minorities
Social groups
Social inequality
Sociological terminology
Majority–minority relations